Strathcona was a provincial electoral district in Alberta, Canada, mandated to return a single member to the Legislative Assembly of Alberta using the first past the post method of voting from 1905 to 1913 and again from 2004 to 2012.

It was renamed Edmonton South in 1917 and subsumed in a city-wide multiple-member district of Edmonton from 1921 to 1956. From 1959 to 1967 Strathcona Centre covered much of the old Strathcona district, with two or three other districts also bearing the Strathcona prefix.

Later it took on the name Edmonton-Strathcona. The name Strathcona is now applied to the Strathcona County area outside the Edmonton corporate electoral district.

History
The constituency of Strathcona existed on two occasions in Alberta's history. The Strathcona electoral district was one of the original 25 electoral districts contested in the 1905 Alberta general election upon Alberta joining Confederation in September 1905. The district was carried over from the old Strathcona electoral district which returned a single member to the Legislative Assembly of the Northwest Territories from 1902 to 1905. During this time, the constituency centred on the City of Strathcona which was amalgamated into the City of Edmonton in 1912. The constituency was abolished prior to the 1913 Alberta general election, and the territory was split between Vegreville, Camrose and Edmonton South. Alexander Rutherford the incumbent from the Northwest Territories Legislative Assembly and first Premier of Alberta was elected as the representative for Strathcona in the 1905 Alberta general election and 1909 Alberta general election.

The Edmonton-Strathcona constituency, of the 1971 to the present period, was re-created in roughly the same place as the 1905-1909 version, in what had formerly (1959-1967) been Strathcona Centre.

A constituency using just the name Strathcona was created in 2004 when it was carved out of the south portion of Redwater and a large chunk of north west Clover Bar-Fort Saskatchewan.

The riding is one of five that used a name from the original twenty five 1905 ridings. The other four are St. Albert, Peace River, Stony Plain and Medicine Hat.

The constituency of Strathcona was sometimes confused with Edmonton-Strathcona so was renamed Strathcona-Sherwood Park. The constituency of Strathcona (2004-2012) bordered the east of Edmonton and was mixed rural, semi-rural and suburban, covering Strathcona County.

Fort Saskatchewan-Vegreville bordered the riding to the north and east. Leduc-Beaumont-Devon bordered the riding to the south. Sherwood Park, Edmonton-Ellerslie, Edmonton-Mill Creek, Edmonton-Beverly-Clareview and Edmonton-Manning bordered to the west.

Strathcona

Boundary history

Election results

1905 general election

1909 general election

2004 general election

2008 general election

Alberta senate elections

2004 Senate nominee election district results
Voters had the option of selecting 4 Candidates on the Ballot

2004 Student Vote

On November 19, 2004 a Student Vote was conducted at participating Alberta schools to parallel the 2004 Alberta general election results. The vote was designed to educate students and simulate the electoral process for persons who have not yet reached the legal majority. The vote was conducted in 80 of the 83 provincial electoral districts with students voting for actual election candidates. Schools with a large student body that reside in another electoral district had the option to vote for candidates outside of the electoral district then where they were physically located.

See also

List of Alberta provincial electoral districts
Strathcona Federal electoral district
Strathcona Northwest Territories territorial electoral district

References

Further reading

External links
Elections Alberta
The Legislative Assembly of Alberta
Electoral Divisions Act 2003
 Demographics for Strathcona
Riding Map for Strathcona
Student Vote Alberta
Strathcona County

Former provincial electoral districts of Alberta
Sherwood Park